Khallil Moustapha Lambin (born 3 August 1992) is a footballer who plays as a forward. Born in the Ivory Coast, Lambin also holds French citizenship.

Career
As a youth player, Lambin joined the JMG Academy in Thailand, before trialing for French Ligue 1 side Lorient and Umm Salal in Qatar. At the start of 2012, Lambin moved to Lebanese Premier League side Ahed for six months. He played seven games in the league, and scored a goal in six games in the 2012 AFC Cup. In summer 2012, Lambin signed for Football League Greece club Ergotelis. He played 27 league games, scoring four goals.

On 12 August 2013, Lambin joined the youth academy of Championship club Sheffield Wednesday on a one-year contract. He moved to Israel in 2014, playing first for Hapoel Bnei Lod and then for Maccabi Yavne in the 2014–15 Liga Leumit. He scored six goals in 21 games that season. Lambin signed for Belgian First Division B side Patro Eisden in 2015, where he scored six goals in 24 games, before joining Shkupi in the Macedonian First Football League the following year, playing 12 games and scoring once.

In January 2017 Lambin moved to Switzerland, first playing for 2. Liga Interregional club Fribourg, then moving to Stade Nyonnais in the Swiss Promotion League six months later. In January 2018, Lambin joined Bavois in a six-month loan.

Honours
Hapoel Bnei Lod
 Toto Cup: 2014–15

References

External links
  (2014–2018)
  (2012)
 

Living people
1992 births
Footballers from Abidjan
Ivorian footballers
French sportspeople of Ivorian descent
Association football forwards
Sheffield Wednesday F.C. players
Ergotelis F.C. players
Al Ahed FC players
Hapoel Bnei Lod F.C. players
Maccabi Yavne F.C. players
K. Patro Eisden Maasmechelen players
KF Shkupi players
FC Fribourg players
FC Stade Nyonnais players
FC Bavois players
Liga Leumit players
Macedonian First Football League players
2. Liga Interregional players
Swiss Promotion League players
Lebanese Premier League players
Football League (Greece) players
Challenger Pro League players
Ivorian expatriate footballers
Expatriate footballers in Thailand
Expatriate footballers in Lebanon
Expatriate footballers in Greece
Expatriate footballers in England
Expatriate footballers in Israel
Expatriate footballers in Belgium
Expatriate footballers in North Macedonia
Expatriate footballers in Switzerland
Ivorian expatriate sportspeople in Thailand
Ivorian expatriate sportspeople in Lebanon
Ivorian expatriate sportspeople in Greece
Ivorian expatriate sportspeople in England
Ivorian expatriate sportspeople in Israel
Ivorian expatriate sportspeople in Belgium
Ivorian expatriate sportspeople in North Macedonia
Ivorian expatriate sportspeople in Switzerland
JMG Academy players